Part Six (Part VI) of the Constitution of Albania is the sixth of eighteen parts.
Titled Local Government, it consists of 8 articles.

Local Government

References

6